Wabana may refer to:

 Wabana, Newfoundland and Labrador, Canada
 Wabana Township, Minnesota, United States